Zhangjiang Town was a historic town and the former seat of Taoyuan County in Hunan, China. The town was reformed through the amalgamation of Chehuyuan Township, Shenshuigang Township and the former Zhangjiang Town on November 20, 2015.

Zhangjiang was located in the west of the county, it was bordered by Fengshu Township and Qinglin Township to the north, Xujiaqiao Township of Dingcheng District and Mutangyuan Township to the east, Yaotianping Town of Dingcheng District to the southeast, Taohuayuan Town, Jianshi Town and Niwotan Township to the southwest,  Sanyanggang Town to the northwest. It ceased to be a separate town and was divided into Zhangjiang Subdistrict and Xunyang Subdistrict in 2017.

History
Zhangjiang was an ancient town with a long history. It had always been the seat of Taoyuan County formed in 963 AD (Song dynasty). It was incorporated as a town in January 1941, it took its name after the Zhangjiang River (漳江), Zhangjiang Town was renamed to Chengguan Town in January 1951.

In 2011, the subdivisions of Zhangjiang were reduced to 14 villages and 16 communities from 31 villages and 16 communities through the amalgamation of villages.

In 2017, Zhangjiang Town was divided into two subdistricts of Zhangjiang and Xunyang.

Subdivisions

References

Taoyuan County
Former township-level divisions of Hunan